Hirsi Magan Isse (1935 — 2008), commonly known as Hirsi Magan, was a scholar and a leading figure of the Somali revolution. Part of Somalia's political elite, he was a leader in the Somali Salvation Democratic Front (SSDF), one of the earliest and most influential factions in the Somali Civil War that broke out in 1991.

Magan Isse was a comrade-in-arms of erstwhile President of Somalia, Abdullahi Yusuf Ahmed, and the father of the former Dutch MP and critic of Islam, Ayaan Hirsi Ali

Personal life
Magan Isse was born in Somalia in 1935 as one of the nine children of Magan Isse Guleid (1845–1945). He was a devout Muslim and student of Somali culture.

Magan Isse married eight times and had nineteen daughters and thirteen sons. He had two daughters with his first wife. His second marriage produced son Mahad, daughter Ayaan, and daughter Haweya. Haweya died in 1998. He also had a daughter in his third marriage. He later remarried his first wife, who he had divorced shortly after he married his second wife.

Magan Isse studied in Italy and in the United States at Columbia University, New York, where he obtained a degree in anthropology. As a trained linguist and anthropologist, he is known as a champion of Osmanya, the Somali writing script invented by Osman Yusuf Kenadid, unlike the former head of state, Siad Barre, who made Shire Jama Ahmed's modified Latin script the national standard in Somalia in 1973

Political and military career
After the assassination of president Abdirashid Ali Shermarke and Siad Barre coming to power in October, 1969, Magan Isse was considered dangerous to the new leadership and was imprisoned from 1972 to October 1975.

In 1976, Magan Isse escaped from prison and fled from Somalia to Saudi Arabia. Barre banned all political parties with the exception of the Somali Revolutionary Socialist Party (SRSF) the same year and the SODAF (a forerunner of the SSDF) was founded in exile in Rome. The following year, Magan Isse moved to Ethiopia, where he witnessed the year-long Ogaden War. It was also the period of the Red Terror of the Derg, and its victims included the Western Somali Liberation Front, an Ogaden-based Somali rebel outfit. For security purposes, Magan Isse opted to relocate his family to a suburb in Nairobi, while he continued to live in Somalia and Ethiopia most of the time.

In the summer of 1982, the SSDF played a key role in the second armed conflict between Somalia and Ethiopia. The SSDF, supported by the Derg leader Mengistu's air force, waged a low intensity guerrilla war against the Somali army. Magan Isse became a well-known figure in Somalia at the time as director and presenter of Radio Kulmis (meaning "Unity" in Somali), which aired anti-Barré programs from Addis Abeba, Ethiopia).

In 1988, Magan Isse and Mohamed Haji Aden headed an insurrection near Eyl in the Nugaal region, part of Puntland, mainly inhabited by Majeerteen of the Issa Mahamoud sub-clans. This insurrection of the SSDF, which started in the southern part of Nugaal and Bari and the western part of Mudug, eventually led to the autonomy of the province of Puntland in 1998.

Later years
Magan Isse spent the better part of his later years in political exile in London, United Kingdom. He died in 2008 at 73 years of age.

See also
Somali Revolution
Persecution of the Majeerteen
Somali Youth League

Notes

References
Somalia: Meeting with Ayan Hirsi Ali
The Guardian, May 17, 2005;
New York Times, April 3, 2005,
Somalia Tribal Study, 2005, p. 14 (on the structure of the clan of Hirsi Magan Isse)
Programs by Xirsi Magan on Radio Kulmis, 1979-1981 (3rd column, 6th from the top)
Telephone conversation between Hirsi Magan Isse and his daughter in "Levy and Sadeghi" (Dutch television program), September 2002 
Ending the conflict in the Somali inhabited territories of Horn of Africa, column by Samtalis Hussein Haille, 2002 

1935 births
Linguists from Somalia
Somalian scientists
2008 deaths
Somali Salvation Democratic Front politicians
Somalian emigrants to the United Kingdom
20th-century linguists